Lahli railway station is a station on the Delhi–Rohtak line. It is located in the Indian state of Haryana. It serves Lahli and surrounding area.

See also
 List of railway stations in Haryana

References

Railway stations in Rohtak district
Railway stations in Haryana